Wadalba Community School is a K-12 school in Wadalba, New South Wales, Australia. The school has a logo of a sugar glider due to the native population of sugar gliders within the area. It appears on the school newsletters, posters, banners and other places around the school, the sugar glider also appears on the junior school uniform which is the white polo shirt which is available for students in Years 6 - 10 to wear. The sugar glider is also on the former sports shirt which was a light blue polo that was the sporting uniform for all years K - 12, although this is no longer the sporting uniform, it is still acceptable for students to wear the light blue polo as normal uniform now. Students in Year 11 & 12 wear a logo of the letters WCS on their white blouse, the WCS logo is also on the navy blue polo sports shirt and the navy blue sport shorts which is available for all students K - 12 to wear. The school is notable for its many sporting achievements. These are celebrated at a sports presentation night which occurs annually. It is also notable for its academic opportunities that it provides students. The school has an annual talent show called Wadalba's Got Talent which is where students get the opportunity to audition and showcast their talents for the school. Wadalba also hosts CAPA (Creative and Performing Arts) nights a few times a year where students in CAPA subjects which include Drama, Dance, Music, Photography and Art showcase their pieces they have worked on in their classes.

School values

Wadalba Community School has three core values: Respect, Responsibility and Excellence. The school believes that these values go hand in hand. "When you show respect, you are showing responsibility which leads to excellence."

History

The first principal since the opening of the school in the year 2000 was Principal Lance Godwin, who played a vital role in establishing the school in the early years. Due to unforeseen delays, the first students that entered through the school began their year 7 studies in demountables behind Wyong High School. Only half of the school was developed when the students moved from Wyong High to the newly built facilities.

References 

Educational institutions established in 2000
Public primary schools in New South Wales
Public high schools in New South Wales
2000 establishments in Australia